Epidauria fulvella is a species of snout moth in the genus Epidauria. It was described by Vladimir Ivanovitsch Kuznetzov in 1978 and is known from Tajikistan.

References

Moths described in 1978
Anerastiini